Meneghin is an Italian surname.  Notable people with the surname include:

 Andrea Meneghin (born 1974), Italian retired professional basketball player and active coach
 Andrea Meneghin (bobsleigh) (born 1958), Italian bobsledder
 Dino Meneghin (born 1950), Italian former basketball player

Italian-language surnames
Families of Milan